Gus Saville (born Augustus C. Tate; 1857  March 25, 1934) was an American silent film actor. He mostly appeared in action films and western films.

Early life and career 
Saville was born in 1857 in Peekskill, New York, the son of U.S. Marshall A.C. Tate. Against his father's wishes, he performed in theatre as a young child and through his adolescence.

Arrest 
In 1890, Saville was arrested for infidelity in Spokane, Washington upon complaint of his wife.

Film career
It is unknown when Saville entered the film industry, as only his feature films could be researched. During his career, Saville appeared in 17 feature films. He was best known for his roles in Tess of the Storm Country (1922), The Brand (1919), Almost a Husband (1919), and The Girl from Outside (1919).

Personal life
Saville was married to Jessie Tate. He died on March 25, 1934 in Hollywood, California at the age of 77.

Partial filmography
 Almost a Husband (1919)
 Two Moons (1920)
 The Wolverine (1921)
 Tess of the Storm Country (1922)
 The Face on the Bar-Room Floor (1923)
 Idaho (1925)
 Wild West (1925)
 The High Hand (1926)

References

External links

1857 births
1934 deaths
20th-century American male actors
American male comedy actors
American male film actors
American male silent film actors
People from Peekskill, New York
Vaudeville performers